Placobdella parasitica is a species of leech found in North America. Leeches are habitual ectoparasites of vertebrates in aquatic environments. Placobdella parasitica is differentiated from other members of the genus Placobdella by its smooth dorsal surface, simple to complicated pigmentation, and abdomen with 8 to 12 stripes.

References

External links

Leeches
Invertebrates of North America
Animals described in 1824
Taxa named by Thomas Say
Parasites of reptiles